Sürpriz were a six-member German-Turkish musical group, consisting of Cihan Özden, Deniz Filizmen, Yasemin Akkar, Filiz Zeyno, Savaş Uçar and Bülent Ural, known for their participation in the Eurovision Song Contest 1999. The word "Sürpriz", means "Surprise" in Turkish.

Biography
The group was formed by Özden in 1999 specifically in order to enter that year's German Eurovision selection with the song "Reise nach Jerusalem - Kudüs'e seyahat" ("Journey to Jerusalem"), which had been written by regular Eurovision composers Ralph Siegel and Bernd Meinunger.  At the original selection held in Bremen on 12 March, "Reise nach Jerusalem - Kudüs'e seyahat" finished in second place behind Corinna May's "Hör den Kindern einfach zu".  However, some days later it emerged that May's song had previously been released by another singer in 1997, which contravened Eurovision rules and led to its disqualification.  As runners-up, Sürpriz were therefore offered the Eurovision spot, but this too caused controversy when allegations of self-plagiarism were made, claiming that the song was remarkably similar to another Siegel composition which had appeared on a B-side in 1984, "Wo geht die Reise hin?" ("Where Does the Journey Go?") by Harmony Four. The matter was taken to the European Broadcasting Union, where a panel of experts concluded that the similarity was not sufficient to disqualify the song on the grounds alleged.

Sürpriz therefore were given the go-ahead to perform in the 44th Eurovision Song Contest, which took place in Jerusalem on 29 May. On the night, the song was performed in a combination of English, German, Turkish and Hebrew, and in what turned out to be a closely fought contest with some notably topsy-turvy voting, "Reise nach Jerusalem - Kudüs'e seyahat" claimed an unexpected third place of the 23 entries.

The good showing at Eurovision failed to translate into substantial sales, and "Reise nach Jerusalem - Kudüs'e seyahat" failed to chart in Germany. The group recorded a self-titled CD, which was released in Turkey only in 2000, and continued through several personnel changes before disbanding in 2002.

References 

German musical groups
Turkish musical groups
Eurovision Song Contest entrants for Germany
Eurovision Song Contest entrants of 1999